Edgar Henry Lechner (December 14, 1919 – November 5, 2015) was an American football guard and tackle who played one season with the New York Giants of the National Football League. He played college football at the University of Minnesota and attended high school in Fessenden, North Dakota. Lechner also served during World War II with the United States Navy. He was later a dentist and lived in St. Paul until his death in 2015.

References

External links

1919 births
2015 deaths
American football guards
Minnesota Golden Gophers football players
New York Giants players
People from Wells County, North Dakota
Players of American football from North Dakota
United States Navy personnel of World War II